Kari Saukkonen (born 7 July 1955) is a Finnish former professional darts player who competed in the 1980s.

Darts career
He competed in the 1986 BDO World Darts Championship and beat Willy Logie in round one but was defeated by Bob Anderson in the second round. He previously played in the 1980 Winmau World Masters, beating Len Heard in the Last 32, but who losing in the last 16 to Nicky Virachkul.

World Championship Results

BDO
1986: Second Round (lost to Bob Anderson 0-3) (sets)

External links
Profile and stats on Darts Database

Finnish darts players
Living people
1955 births
British Darts Organisation players
People from Joensuu
Sportspeople from North Karelia